The Artsakh Freedom Fighters Union is a military veterans organization of the Artsakh Defence Army. It serves as an organization that honours Soviet/Armenian veterans of war, whether they hail from Armenia or the Artsakh Republic.  It was established on 23 February (the traditional Defender of the Fatherland Day holiday) in the year 2000. On Shushi Liberation Day in 2013, a newly-erected building for the union was opened on Renaissance Square. On 2 April 2016, an independent battalion was formed adjacent to the union building. It is community association, operating n 181 communities of the country. The union has a youth wing called Hayrenyats Pashtpan (Motherland Defender), which was established in April 2006. In 2007, personnel of the union took part in the Liberation Day military parade for the first time. The main purpose is to render financial assistance to the families of dead soldiers and living veterans of the Second world War, the First Nagorno-Karabakh War and the 2016 Nagorno-Karabakh clashes.

See also 

 Union of Officers of Moldova
 Russian All-Military Union

References 

Military of the Republic of Artsakh
Veterans' organizations